The 1898 Centre football team represented Centre College as an independent the 1898 college football season. Led by Dick Van Winkle in his first and only season as head coach, Centre compiled a record of 2–1–2.

Schedule

References

Centre
Centre Colonels football seasons
Centre football